Carson Reed Ware (born February 28, 2000) is an American professional stock car racing driver. He last competed part-time in the NASCAR Xfinity Series, driving the No. 17 Chevrolet Camaro for Rick Ware Racing, No. 52 for Jimmy Means Racing, and No. 74 for Mike Harmon Racing. He has also raced in the ARCA Menards Series and NASCAR Gander Outdoors Truck Series.

Racing career
Before racing in NASCAR and the ARCA Menards Series, Ware competed in Pro Late Models. In October 2019, he made his ARCA debut at Kansas Speedway with Rick Ware Racing in a partnership with Venturini Motorsports. The following month, he joined Reaume Brothers Racing for his first NASCAR Gander Outdoors Truck Series event with the Lucas Oil 150 at ISM Raceway.

In May 2020, Ware made his NASCAR Xfinity Series debut at Bristol Motor Speedway with SS-Green Light Racing; the team had formed an alliance with Rick Ware Racing to run the No. 07 car for Ware and RWR's other drivers.

Personal life
He is the son of Rick Ware and brother of Cody Ware.

On October 20, 2021, Ware was arrested in Rowan County, North Carolina, on assault and property damage charges. NASCAR indefinitely suspended him after the arrest. On June 8, 2022, NASCAR lifted Ware's suspension.

Motorsports career results

NASCAR
(key) (Bold – Pole position awarded by qualifying time. Italics – Pole position earned by points standings or practice time. * – Most laps led.)

Xfinity Series

Gander Outdoors Truck Series

ARCA Menards Series
(key) (Bold – Pole position awarded by qualifying time. Italics – Pole position earned by points standings or practice time. * – Most laps led.)

 Season still in progress
 Ineligible for series points

References

External links
 

2000 births
NASCAR drivers
ARCA Menards Series drivers
People from Jamestown, North Carolina
Living people
Racing drivers from North Carolina
People charged with assault